Arne Herjuaune (7 October 1945 – 21 March 2017) was a Norwegian speed skater. He was born in Malvik and represented Trondhjems SK. He competed at the 1968 Winter Olympics in Grenoble, where he shared 5th in the 500 metres.

References

External links

1945 births
2017 deaths
People from Sør-Trøndelag
People from Malvik
Norwegian male speed skaters
Olympic speed skaters of Norway
Speed skaters at the 1968 Winter Olympics
Sportspeople from Trøndelag
20th-century Norwegian people